The NWA United States Television Championship was a professional wrestling television championship owned and promoted by the Capitol Wrestling Corporation (CWC), the predecessor of WWE. The championship was introduced in 1957, making it the first singles championship introduced overall by the CWC and WWE.

Reigns

Footnotes

References

External links
United States Television Title

 

WWE championships
National Wrestling Alliance championships
United States professional wrestling championships
Television wrestling championships